The 2022–23 Tennessee Tech Golden Eagles men's basketball team represented Tennessee Technological University in the 2022–23 NCAA Division I men's basketball season. The Golden Eagles, led by fourth-year head coach John Pelphrey, played their home games at the Eblen Center in Cookeville, Tennessee as members of the Ohio Valley Conference.

Previous season
The Golden Eagles finished the 2021–22 season 11–21, 7–10 in OVC play to finish in seventh place. As the No. 7 seed, they defeated Austin Peay in the first round of the OVC tournament, before falling to Morehead State in the quarterfinals.

Roster

Schedule and results

|-
!colspan=12 style=""| Exhibition

|-
!colspan=12 style=""| Non-conference regular season

|-
!colspan=12 style=""| OVC regular season

|-
!colspan=9 style=| Ohio Valley tournament

|-

Sources

References

Tennessee Tech Golden Eagles men's basketball seasons
Tennessee Tech Golden Eagles
Tennessee Tech Golden Eagles men's basketball
Tennessee Tech Golden Eagles men's basketball